Hadrobregmus denticollis is a species of death-watch beetle in the family Anobiidae.

References

Further reading

External links

 

Anobiinae
Beetles described in 1796